The Standard Oil Company (Ohio) was an American oil company, a successor of the original company established in 1870 by John D. Rockefeller. It was established as "Standard Oil Company of Ohio" as one of the separate entities created after the 1911 breakup.

In the 1960s, Standard Oil of Ohio partnered with British Petroleum, in the development of the Prudhoe Bay, Alaska petroleum reserves and the construction of the Trans Alaska pipeline. The complex partnership called for a gradual stock acquisition until British Petroleum would eventually gain controlling interest culminating in total acquisition of the American company. The company ceased operations in 1987, although BP continued to sell gasoline under the 'Sohio' brand until 1991.

History 
Under the name "Standard Oil of Ohio", the company was established as a separate business after the antitrust breakup the oil conglomerate's monopoly in 1911. It operated service stations under the 'Sohio' brand name in Ohio but was prohibited in using the 'Standard' name in other states. In nearby states, it used the Boron brand name (introduced in 1954) instead, but with an otherwise-similar logo. Wallace Trevor Holliday was President of the company from 1928 to 1949 and Chairman of the Board from 1949 until his death on November 7, 1950.

In 1968, Sohio's CEO, Charlie Spahr, arranged a merger with British Petroleum. It was announced as Standard's acquisition of British Petroleum's North American interests in exchange for British Petroleum receiving 25% of Sohio's stock. However, the contract included a stipulation that British Petroleum would assume majority interest when Standard's share of production from the Prudhoe Bay oilfield in Alaska reached . That occurred in 1978, and British Petroleum then took control of Standard Oil. The U.S. operations were unified under the BP America corporate name.

By 1991, BP had rebranded all Sohio and Boron retail stations as 'BP', except for some marine fuel outlets.

In 2011, a BP station in Steubenville, Ohio that had originally opened as a Sohio station in 1946 ended fuel sales and was restored to 1970s vintage Sohio colors as a museum for Sohio. The site has vintage (non-working) Sohio pumps and other Sohio memorabilia. The garage itself remains active.

Stations 
By 1980, Sohio and Boron had 3,400 gas stations in Ohio, Michigan, Pennsylvania, Indiana, Kentucky and West Virginia. Sohio acquired 5,660 former Gulf stations as a result of FTC anti-trust limitations in Chevron's 1985 takeover of Gulf. These stations, bought for $1 billion, were in Alabama, Georgia, Kentucky, Mississippi, Tennessee, North Carolina and South Carolina. Sohio was allowed to use the "Gulf" name for five years after the acquisition.

By the end of 1985, all other Standard Oil descendants had minimized use of the name Standard, following Standard Oil of Indiana renaming itself Amoco earlier in the year as well as Chevron's aforementioned merger with Gulf that same year that led to its official corporate name to change from Standard Oil of California to Chevron Corporation. As a result, Standard of Ohio corporately rebrand itself in 1986 under the Standard name, while continuing to use the Sohio brand in Ohio. In 1987, BP bought the 45% of Sohio it did not already own for $7.82 Billion and assumed control. Among the first changes was the rebranding of all Sohio, Boron, & Gulf stations that it owned to 'BP' in 1991. Among the conversions included former Mobil stations in Western Pennsylvania (including Pittsburgh) that Standard of Ohio acquired in 1987 when Mobil left that market, most of which had just rebranded as Boron when they were converted to BP.

The Boron name was used outside of Ohio in neighboring states, like Michigan, Pennsylvania, Kentucky and West Virginia. Boron was also the branding of its premium grade gasoline along with its regular grade fuel "Extron" (formerly "Ex-tane" later "Octron") and its unleaded version "Cetron" introduced in 1970.

Standard Oil of Ohio's motor oil brands included Boron, Sohio, Cetron, CHD, Duron, Multron, Nitrex, Nitron, Octron, Premex, and Qvo. 

Sohio's credit cards, like other oil company cards at the time, could be used at competitors' stations outside the issuing company's competitive territory, which in Sohio's case was Ohio. The benefit died with the Sohio brand. Exxon had a similar arrangement as well. In 1916, Sohio introduced a prefabricated canopy prototype for its stations. Although Sohio gas stations have ceased to exist, a few marina gas stations on Lake Erie and the Ohio River still bear the Sohio name.

When BP merged with Amoco in 1998, its American headquarters moved from the former BP America Building on Public Square in Cleveland to Chicago. Its American headquarters have since moved to the Houston Energy Corridor in Houston, Texas, in line with the corporate offices of Shell Oil Company and fellow Standard spinoffs ConocoPhillips & Marathon Oil.

Subsidiaries

Hospitality Motor Inns 
Hospitality Motor Inns, a wholly owned Sohio subsidiary, operated 11 motor inns in Ohio and surrounding states The company was formed in 1963 as a Sohio subsidiary. Hospitality became a publicly held company when Sohio sold off 51% of the company to the public. Sohio sold its remaining interest of the chain to Hosmin, Inc., in 1978.

ProCare 
In the 1980s, as many gas stations began converting their vehicle service bays into convenience stores, Sohio wished to continue performing auto maintenance by launching a specialty auto repair shop. Called Sohio ProCare, these shops were often located near Sohio stations that now had convenience stores instead of auto service and were more specialized compared to traditional auto garages located at gas stations. The locations were mostly in Ohio, but Sohio did expand the concept into Pennsylvania and North Carolina, where they were known as "Boron ProCare". Also, unlike many Sohio stations, the ProCare locations were owned and operated directly by Sohio. Commercials for ProCare often featured M*A*S*H actor Gary Burghoff as "That Sohio Guy", as part of a larger Sohio advertising campaign featuring Burghoff. Burghoff himself would stay with BP for a time as a spokesperson after BP converted Sohio and its other brands to BP.

BP retained ProCare following its absorption of Sohio, rebranding it as "BP ProCare" and changing the colors in its logo to match BP. BP continued to operate it until selling off the chain to a private investment group in 1999, at which point the shops were simply called ProCare without an oil company prefix and its logo was reverted to its Sohio-era colors. Following a bankruptcy under the private investment group's ownership, ProCare would ultimately be acquired by Monro Muffler Brake in 2006, and converted the locations to its own brands.

Gallery

References

External links

 
 

Defunct oil companies of the United States
Automotive fuel retailers
Gas stations in the United States
Standard Oil
Former BP subsidiaries
Defunct companies based in Cleveland
Energy companies established in 1911
Non-renewable resource companies established in 1911
1870 establishments in Ohio
1911 establishments in Ohio
Defunct companies based in Ohio
History of Cleveland